West Shamokin Junior Senior High School (WSHS) is a small, public high school located in Rural Valley, Pennsylvania. It is one of three high schools operated by the Armstrong School District. In 2013, West Shamokin Junior Senior High School's enrollment was 722 pupils in grades 7th through 12th.West Shamokin High School is apart of the Armstrong School District. The useful items at West Shamokin includes; handicap accessible, computer systems, emergency, security guards, lighting and power, as well as an access bridge to the school.West Shamokin High School has a specific design that was trying to be followed.The school resulted in a one-story building that includes a gymnasium, auditorium, several classrooms, a lunch room for students, faculty room, a kitchen, courtyard, band room/music room, computer labs, and offices for the staff.The one story building does include all of the necessities for a school, but all on one floor. The outside facilities include, a Fitness Center, a Baseball/Softball fields, a soccer practice field, and a turf football field.The main goal for the school was to have a supportive educational building that results in a rural environment.The building was finished in June of 2000. West Shamokin has a student/ teacher ratio of 10.6:1.

Race/Equity 
West Shamokin is also not a school that comes into issues with race.The school is accepting of everyone.Even though the school is 99% white and only 1% black, it does accept anyone who is attending West Shamokin High School. There are also some students with disabilities that attend West Shamokin High School.There are certain staff members that are dedicated to these specific students to give them some assistance throughout the day.The ratio is 4/10 students have disabilities in West Shamokin, but not all of the students have a student aid or a specific staff member that is with them throughout the day.

History 
West Shamokin was built to consolidate the Shannock Valley Jr/Sr High School and the Dayton Jr/Sr High School.West Shamokin High School was founded and in June of 2000. West Shamokin has some information available about the history of test scores of previous graduates as well as current students.This information helps out the upcoming students and parents on how well West Shamokin can give their children an education.The test scores of the students are above state average. Although, the test scores come out at a good level, the college success from West Shamokin High School has come to 74% of students have had college success, which is over 50% and at an average level.

Vocational training 
High school students have the option to attend Lenape Tech for vocational training in the trades. When the students come into their Sophomore year, they can attend Lenape Tech for half a day. When they become a Junior in High School, they can attend Lenape Tech for the entire school day.

Extracurriculars
The West Shamokin Junior Senior High School offers a variety of clubs, activities and an extensive sports program.West Shamokin High School is not only a place for learning, but its a school that allows the students to get involved in extracurricular.West Shamokin has clubs that are as following; Leo Club, National Honor Society, Yearbook Club, Key Club, Quiz Bowl, FCS Competition, School Store, and Newspaper.There is so much more than just coming to school everyday, there is after school or early morning times that these clubs meet to help the school as a whole.

Sports
The district funds the following sports at West Shamokin Junior Senior High School:

Varsity and JV

Junior high school sports

Boys
Basketball
Football
Soccer
Wrestling 

Girls
Basketball
Cheer
Volleyball

According to PIAA directory July 2013

References

External links
 West Shamokin High School Website

Public high schools in Pennsylvania
Educational institutions established in 2000
Schools in Armstrong County, Pennsylvania
Education in Pittsburgh area
Public middle schools in Pennsylvania
2000 establishments in Pennsylvania